Re-Boot: Live '98 (also called Re:Boot or [:RE: BOOT]) is a live album from Front 242, released in 1998. This album stands in contrast to the band's previous live album Live Code, in that many of its tracks are radical reworkings of the band's earlier songs. Front 242 has identified The Prodigy as an influence on the style of this album. A similar style is also used on the Front 242 live performance DVD, Catch the Men. In the U.S., the album peaked at #71 on the CMJ Radio Top 200 while hitting #1 on the CMJ RPM chart.

Track listing

References

Front 242 albums
1998 live albums
Metropolis Records live albums